Atlanta riot or Atlanta riots may refer to:

1906 Atlanta race riot
1967 Atlanta riots
1987 Atlanta prison riots

See also
2020 George Floyd protests in Atlanta
2020 reaction to the killing of Rayshard Brooks
2023 Atlanta riot following the killing of Manuel Esteban Paez Terán